The 45th Launch Group is a United States Air Force unit.  It is assigned to the 45th Space Wing, stationed at Cape Canaveral Air Force Station, Florida.

Overview
The 45th Launch Group participates in receipt, inspection, processing, test, and launch of all flight hardware to ensure the successful launch of satellites to support national and combatant commander requirements. The group contributes to mission success through seamless partnership with launch/satellite program offices.

Components
 5th Space Launch Squadron
 The 5th Space Launch Squadron mission is to ensure the success of the Atlas V and Delta IV programs at CCAFS by fostering innovative teamwork among the Wing, SPO and industry.

 45th Launch Support Squadron
 The 45th Launch Support Squadron is the "flightline" for Department of Defense (DoD) spacecraft. LCSS personnel oversee spacecraft hardware arrival, processing, testing and launch through direct delegation from spacecraft development wings throughout the DoD, ultimately providing launch base mission assurance for the Program Executive Officer for Space. In addition, the squadron is responsible for ensuring continued delivery of critical mission-ready facilities, training and programmatic resources to the launch group, the wing and its customers.

History

In order to handle space operations more effectively, senior officials at Air Force Space Command, Air Force Materiel Command, Space and Missile Systems Center (SMC), 14th Air Force, the 30th Space Wing, and the 45th Space Wing agreed to fine tune the new standard wing organization in 2003. Following approval at the highest levels of the Air Force, an organizational transformation was implemented on 1 December 2003, discontinuing SMC Detachment 8 and activating the 45th Launch Group which also included elements of the 45th Operations Group. As a result of the transformation, the 45th Launch Group was constituted and assigned to Air Force Space Command with further assignment to the 45th Space Wing.  The 5th Space Launch Squadron (inactivated 29 June 1998) was reactivated at Cape Canaveral on 1 December 2003. The 5th was placed under the 45th Launch Group, and the squadron was given responsibility for Evolved Expendable Launch Vehicle (EELV) operations formerly held by Detachment 8, along with the 1st Space Launch Squadron performing Delta II operations and the 3rd Space Launch Squadron performing Titan IV and Atlas II/III operations.

The final Atlas IIIB/Centaur and Titan IVB missions were launched from Cape Canaveral in February and April 2005 respectively. Consequently, the 3rd Space Squadron—which had been responsible for managing both launch programs—was inactivated effective 30 June 2005. On the same date, the 45th Launch Support Squadron was activated and placed under the 45th Launch Group. The ceremony for both organizational changes was held at the Cape on the morning of 6 July 2005.

The 1st SLS was inactivated on 18 August 2009, following the final USAF launch of a Delta II which had occurred the previous day.

Lineage
 Established as 45th Launch Group on 28 Oct 2003
 Activated on 1 December 2003.

Assignments
 45th Space Wing, 1 December 2003 – Present

Units
 1st Space Launch Squadron: 1 December 2003 – 18 August 2009
 3d Space Launch Squadron: 1 December 2003 – 30 June 2005
 5th Space Launch Squadron: 1 December 2003 – Present
 45th Launch Support Squadron: 30 June 2005 – Present

Stations
 Cape Canaveral Air Force Station, Florida, 1 December 2003 – Present

References

 45th Launch Group at AFHRA
 45th Launch Group
 Bittersweet launch ends several chapters of history

Space groups of the United States Air Force